Andrographis paniculata, commonly known as creat or green chiretta, is an annual herbaceous plant in the family Acanthaceae, native to India and Sri Lanka.

It is widely cultivated in Southern and Southeastern Asia, where it has been believed to be a treatment for bacterial infections and some diseases. Mostly the leaves and roots have been used for such purposes; the whole plant is also used, in some cases.

Description

The slender stem is dark green, square in cross-section with longitudinal furrows and wings along the angles. The small flowers are pink, solitary, arranged in lax spreading racemes or panicles. It contains many yellow-brown seeds. The seeds are subquadrate, rugose and glabrous. The flowering time is September to December.

Distribution
The species is distributed in tropical Asian countries, often in isolated patches. It can be found in a variety of habitats, such as plains, hillsides, coastlines, and disturbed and cultivated areas such as roadsides and farms. Native populations of A. paniculata are spread throughout south India and Sri Lanka which perhaps represent the center of origin and diversity of the species. The herb is an introduced species in northern parts of India, Java, Malaysia, Indonesia, the West Indies, and elsewhere in the Americas. The species also occurs in the Philippines, Hong Kong, Thailand, Brunei, Singapore, and other parts of Asia where it may or may not be native. The plant is cultivated in many areas, as well.

In India the major source of plant is procured from its wild habitat. The plant is categorised as Low Risk or of Least Concern by the IUCN. Under the trade name Kalmegh, on average  of the plant is traded in India.

Cultivation
The plant does best in a sunny location. The seeds are sown during May and June (northern hemisphere).

Vernacular names
creat (English)
green chiretta (English)
king of bitter.
phtuhs' (smau) (phtuhs'''="explosion", smau="grass", referring to sound of its ripe fruit opening, Khmer language)prâmat' mnu:hs (smau) (="human gall grass", probably alluding to its folk-medical use, Khmer language)
ฟ้าทะลายโจร (RTGS: fa thalai chon) ('heaven breaks down the bandit', Thai language)
穿心莲, chuan xin lian (Standard Chinese)roi des amers (French)sambiloto in Indonesian languagehempedu bumi (Malaysia)kalmegh (Bengali)

Uses

Alternative medicine

 Traditional Use A. paniculata has been used in Siddha and Ayurvedic medicine, and is promoted as a dietary supplement for cancer prevention and cure. There is no evidence that it helps prevent or cure cancer.

In the traditional medicine of India, A. paniculata has also been used for jaundice therapy.A. paniculata has also traditionally been used in India and China for the common cold and influenza. A 2017 (pre COVID-19) meta-analysis evaluating Andrographis paniculata for acute respiratory tract infections (ARTI) indicated possible support for its efficacy and safety, but cautioned that the trials reviewed were of poor quality and thus not conclusive.

 COVID-19 
Amid Thailand's COVID-19 outbreak in December 2020, the country's health ministry approved the usage of the plant extract for a pilot alternative treatment program. In July 2021, the Cabinet of Thailand approved the use of green chiretta to treat asymptomatic COVID patients after the Thai Corrections Department said the drug was beneficial in prison inmates. Claims as to its efficacy as a COVID therapeutic are contentious and in dispute.

 Safety Concerns 
A 2012 review found that A. paniculata extracts could inhibit expression of several cytochrome C enzymes and thus interfere with metabolism of other pharmaceuticals. A 2019 review finds that A. paniculata compounds have poor solubility and relatively low potency, and that a semi-synthetic injectable derivative can cause sometimes life-threatening allergic reactions.

Food
In Cambodia the dried root macerated in alcohol is consumed as an aperitive, while the seeds make a black jelly called chahuoy khmau.

Chemistry
Andrographolide is the major constituent extracted from the leaves of the plant and is a bicyclic diterpenoid lactone. This bitter principle was isolated in pure form by Gorter in 1911.  Systematic studies on chemistry of A. paniculata have been carried out.

Some known constituents are:
14-Deoxy-11-dehydroandrographolide, Plant
14-Deoxy-11-oxoandrographolide, Plant
5-Hydroxy-7,8,2',3'-Tetramethoxyflavone, Plant
5-Hydroxy-7,8,2'-Trimethoxyflavone, Tissue Culture
Andrographine,	Root
Andrographolide, Plant
Neoandrographolide, Plant
Panicoline, Root
Paniculide-A, Plant
Paniculide-B, Plant
Paniculide-C, Plant

See also
List of ineffective cancer treatments
Xiyanping

References

Further reading

External links

 Andrographis (www.plantnames.unimelb.edu.au)
Dr. Duke's Database
 Contains a detailed monograph on Andrographis paniculatus'' (Bhunimba) as well as a discussion of health benefits and usage in clinical practice.  Available online at https://web.archive.org/web/20110519163542/http://www.toddcaldecott.com/index.php/herbs/learning-herbs/390-bhunimba

Andrographis paniculata (Burm. f.) Nees Medicinal Plant Images Database (School of Chinese Medicine, Hong Kong Baptist University)  
穿心蓮, Common Andrographis Herb, Chuan Xin Lian Chinese Medicine Specimen Database (School of Chinese Medicine, Hong Kong Baptist University)  
Centre for Reviews and Dissemination (CRD) databases Cochrane Library of Systematic Reviews

Acanthaceae
Edible plants
Flora of the Indian subcontinent
Medicinal plants of Asia
Plants used in Ayurveda
Taxa named by Nicolaas Laurens Burman
Lamiales of Asia